These are the Swedish Division 2 standings for the 1974 season. The league was won by GIF Sundsvall, who were promoted to the Allsvenskan.

League standings

Norra

Södra

References
Sweden - List of final tables (Clas Glenning)

Swedish Football Division 2 seasons
2
Sweden
Sweden